Christophe Cazarelly (born 10 February 1975 in Marseille) is a French former professional football player.

He played on the professional level in Ligue 2 for Stade Lavallois, Amiens SC and Stade de Reims.

External links
 
 Christophe Cazarelly profile at Foot-national.com
 

1975 births
Living people
Association football midfielders
French footballers
Ligue 2 players
Stade Lavallois players
Amiens SC players
Stade de Reims players
SO Cassis Carnoux players
Athlético Marseille players